Alnsjøen (also called Alunsjøen) is a lake in Lillomarka in Oslo, Norway. The lake is drained by the Alna River to the Oslofjord. The surrounding area was utilized for copper mining during the 18th century. The lake functions as a minor water reservoir for the city of Oslo (the main water reservoir being the lake Maridalsvannet).

References

Lakes of Oslo